Warta Bolesławiecka is a village in Bolesławiec County, Lower Silesian Voivodeship, in south-western Poland. It is the seat of the administrative district (gmina) called Gmina Warta Bolesławiecka. Prior to 1945 it was in Germany.

From 1975 to 1998 the village was in Legnica Voivodeship.

References

Villages in Bolesławiec County